Ab Surakh (also Romanized as Āb Sūrākh; also known as Ābsūrākhak) is a village in Dadenjan Rural District, Meymand District, Firuzabad County, Fars Province, Iran. At the 2006 census, its population was 78, in 17 families.

References 

Populated places in Firuzabad County